The Tragedy of a Lost Soul is a 1927 German silent drama film directed by Hans Steinhoff and starring Alfred Abel, Helga Molander and Ralph Arthur Roberts. It was shot at the Terra Studios in Berlin. The film's sets were designed by the art director Alfred Junge.

Cast
 Alfred Abel
 Helga Molander
 Ralph Arthur Roberts
 Alfred Gerasch
 Tzwetta Tzatschewa
 Sophie Pagay
 Kurt Gerron
 Philipp Manning
 Paul Rehkopf
 Emil Heyse

References

Bibliography
 Grange, William. Cultural Chronicle of the Weimar Republic. Scarecrow Press, 2008.

External links

1927 films
1927 drama films
Films of the Weimar Republic
German silent feature films
German drama films
Films directed by Hans Steinhoff
Terra Film films
German black-and-white films
Silent drama films
1920s German films
Films shot at Terra Studios
1920s German-language films